Manuel Garcia (10 June 1910 – 25 June 1988) was a French racing cyclist. He rode in the 1935 Tour de France.

References

1910 births
1988 deaths
French male cyclists
Place of birth missing